"Her" is a song by American rapper Megan Thee Stallion from her second studio album Traumazine (2022). It was produced by CashMoneyAP, YoungKio, Malibu Babie and Vaugh Oliver.

Composition
"Her" is a hip house song that finds Megan Thee Stallion boastfully rapping about her pride as a woman, as well as dismissing her haters and negative criticism toward her.
Craig Jenkins of Vulture described the song as starting with "'80s-party-rap bars but switches to Biggie flows in verse two."

Critical reception
The song received generally positive reviews from music critics. Abby Jones of Consequence praised the song, writing, "'Her' is upbeat, but where Good News felt like she was brushing off the pain, the new song sounds like she's finding the light at the end of the tunnel after she's finally processed it all." Adrianne Reece of Elite Daily wrote, "Though the lyrics are simple, the rapper's charismatic delivery accentuates the track's throbbing production in the grooviest way. Seriously, there's no way you can listen to this rightfully boastful number without belting the chorus."

Live performances
On August 12, 2022, Megan Thee Stallion performed the song on Good Morning America.

Music video
The official music video was directed by Colin Tilley and released on August 15, 2022. Shot in black and white, the video sees Megan Thee Stallion delivering "statuesque poses", performing choreography with a group of dancers in matching outfits and facing against a clone of herself.

Charts

References

2022 songs
2022 singles
Megan Thee Stallion songs
Songs written by Megan Thee Stallion
Songs written by CashMoneyAP
300 Entertainment singles
Hip house songs